Archiminolia wanganellica is a species of sea snail, a marine gastropod mollusk in the family Solariellidae.

Description
The diameter of the shell attains 8.6 mm.

Distribution
This marine species is endemic to New Zealand and occurs off the Norfolk Ridge at a depth of 113 m.

References

 Marshall B.A. (1999). A revision of the Recent Solariellinae (Gastropoda: Trochoidea) of the New Zealand region. The Nautilus 113(1): 4-42

External links

wanganellica
Gastropods of New Zealand
Gastropods described in 1999